is a Japanese tokusatsu drama series produced by Toei Company and TV Asahi. It is the 30th series in the Kamen Rider franchise and the first series in the Reiwa period. The show premiered on September 1, 2019, following the finale of Kamen Rider Zi-O, and joined Kishiryu Sentai Ryusoulger, and later, Mashin Sentai Kiramager in the Super Hero Time lineup before concluding on August 30, 2020.

The series' theme revolves around technological singularity and artificial intelligence, a theme shared with the company, Hiden Intelligence, who face threats from the cyber-terrorist group, MetsubouJinrai.net, who want to take over and bring extinction to the human race via a tech uprising.

Plot

The story takes place in a world where Japan has entered a new era of technological innovations as Hiden Intelligence, the leading company in artificial intelligence research, develops human-like androids called Humagears, which quickly become a staple in both public and private sectors. However, a cyber-terrorist organization known as "MetsubouJinrai.net" starts hacking into Humagears, transforming them into monsters called "Magias" and turning them against humanity. The government responds by establishing the Artificial Intelligence Military Service, or A.I.M.S., to destroy them.

The story primarily follows Aruto Hiden, a young man with aspirations of becoming a comedian who suddenly finds himself appointed as the new CEO of Hiden Intelligence after his grandfather's death. Despite his initial disinterest, Aruto changes his mind after witnessing MetsubouJinrai.net's terrorist attacks firsthand; maintaining appearances as CEO while becoming Kamen Rider Zero-One to realize his late father's wish for a peaceful co-existence between humans and Humagears. This places him in an uneasy alliance with A.I.M.S. operatives, Isamu Fuwa and Yua Yaiba, who can transform into Kamen Rider Vulcan and Kamen Rider Valkyrie respectively, against MetsubouJinrai.net; led by the rogue Humagears Horobi and Jin, who can also transform into Kamen Riders.

All the while, Gai Amatsu, the CEO of Hiden's corporate rival ZAIA Enterprise, initially watches their battles from afar before moving forward with his agenda to destroy all Humagears and create a society only for humans with his company in the forefront. He later develops the Kamen Rider Thouser system to achieve his goals and personally enter the fray as well as devices to transform humans into “Raiders”. As the ideals of Aruto, Gai, and MetsubouJinrai.net collide, a three-way battle takes place to decide the future for both Humagears and humankind. However, after the A.I. "Ark" ascends into a Kamen Rider form and threatens the world, they are forced to settle their differences and join forces to stop it.

Production
Development for the show had begun during the summer of 2018. Producer Takahito Omori had visited several technological institutes and spoke with many professors and experts on the topic of artificial intelligence. The suit's design was completed in time before the Reiwa-era change, but a name had not been decided on yet. Omori came up with the idea of "Rei-One", which was a shortening of "Reiwa's first Rider." It was later pointed out that "rei" could also be read as "zero", and that there was already a superhero named Kikaider with the "01" moniker. With the show's heavy technology theme, the name "Zero-One" was chosen as a reference to binary code and the trademark was registered by Toei on April 19, 2019. Three months later, a press conference was announced by an unnamed Humagear on the Kamen Rider Zi-O Twitter account.

In July, Kamen Rider Zero-One was officially announced during a press conference alongside its cast.

Two members of the band Monkey Majik revealed that they will be providing the voices for the Hiden Zero-One Driver and the Progrise Keys.

The theme song is "REAL×EYEZ", a collaboration by J×Takanori Nishikawa. J composed the song, while Nishikawa provides the vocals. Vocaloid producer DJ'Tekina//Something provided the song's arrangement.

Impact of the COVID-19 pandemic

As a result of the ongoing COVID-19 pandemic in Japan, the filming schedule changed and the series' television broadcast was delayed following episode 35. During the break period, Zero-One released five special episodes that reflect past events as recounted by the main characters. The two-part "President Special," focusing on Aruto Hiden and Is, the "Shooting Special," focusing on Isamu Fuwa and Yua Yaiba, and the two-part "Super Job War".

After Japan lifted the state of emergence on May 26, filming of Zero-One and other related Japanese dramas were allowed to resume filming starting on June 1. However, new restrictions were announced, such as filming staff maintaining a distance of at least two meters and only allowing 20 extras in a single scene while scenes with mass crowds will be handled with composite editing. In addition, Zero-Ones broadcasting resumed on 21 June 2020. In regards to the summer movie, it was postponed alongside Mashin Sentai Kiramager the Movie: Be-Bop Dream due to the pandemic.

Episodes

The series is divided into four arcs:
Episode 1-16: The Secret Manuevering of MetsubouJinrai.net: This arc focuses on the threat of the cyber-terrorist group, MetsubouJinrai.net, who seek to bring extinction to the human race.
Episode 17-29: 5-Round Workplace Competition, ZAIA Enterprise: This arc focuses on Hiden Intelligence facing their corporate rival, ZAIA Enterprise, in a battle for technological supremacy.
Episode 30-35.5: Struggle! Hiden Manufacturing: This arc focuses on Aruto establishing a new company, Hiden Manufacturing, after ZAIA’s takeover of Hiden Intelligence and their continuous attempts to stop him as well as the resurgence of MetsubouJinrai.net.
Episode 36-45: Take Off Toward The Future! Hiden Intelligence: With MetsubouJinrai.net active again, their leader, the artificial intelligence Ark becomes Kamen Rider Ark-Zero to enslave humanity. In response, Aruto and his allies must join forces to stop it from achieving its goals. However, Aruto willingly becomes Kamen Rider Ark-One to avenge his friend, Is, who died at the hands of Horobi.

Films
Kamen Rider Zero-One made his first appearance as a cameo in the film Kamen Rider Zi-O the Movie: Over Quartzer.

Reiwa The First Generation

A Movie War film, titled  was released on December 21, 2019, featuring the casts of Kamen Rider Zero-One and the last Heisei Kamen Rider series, Kamen Rider Zi-O. Actress Rina Ikoma and actor Sōkō Wada portrayed the Time Jacker Finis and the Humagear Will respectively. This movie introduces another version of Kamen Rider Zero-One known as Kamen Rider Zerozero-One, and the Kamen Rider 1-inspired Kamen Rider Ichi-Gata. This movie is a shared tribute to the original series, Kamen Rider, and the entire Heisei Kamen Rider Series as a whole. The events of the film take place between episodes 9 and 10.

Real×Time

 was originally scheduled for release on July 23, 2020, double billed with Mashin Sentai Kiramagers film, but both were postponed due to the COVID-19 pandemic. On August 30, 2020, the film was given a new release date of December 18, 2020. On October 18, 2020, it was announced that the film will be double billed with Kamen Rider Saber Theatrical Short Story: The Phoenix Swordsman and the Book of Ruin. In the film, which is set after the final episode of the TV series, actor Hideaki Itō portrayed the film's main antagonist.

Special episodes
 is Televi-Kuns . This events of this special take place between episodes 13 and 14.
 is a web-exclusive series released on Toei's official YouTube channel.
 is included as part of the Blu-ray releases of Kamen Rider Zero-One. This side story comprises two episodes and focuses on Gai Amatsu. The events of this miniseries take place before episode 17.
 is a special two-part recap miniseries told from the perspective of Aruto Hiden and Is.
 is a special recap episode told from the perspective of Isamu Fuwa and Yua Yaiba.
 is a special two-part episode covering the jobs the cast has seen performed during the series.

Zero-One Others
 is a series of V-Cinema releases written by Yuya Takahashi and directed by Masaya Kakehi that serve as spin-offs for characters from the Kamen Rider Zero-One series. The events of the V-Cinemas take place after the end of the main series and Kamen Rider Zero-One the Movie: Real×Time.
 is a side story that focuses on MetsubouJinrai.net members Horobi, Jin, Ikazuchi, and Naki. Actor Jai West portrayed the film's main antagonist, Lyon Arkland. The V-Cinema received a limited theatrical release on March 26, 2021, followed by its DVD and Blu-ray release on July 14, 2021. The theme song is "S.O.S" performed by Monkey Majik.
 is a side story that focuses on Isamu Fuwa and Yua Yaiba. The V-Cinema received a limited theatrical release on August 27, 2021, followed by its DVD and Blu-ray release on November 10, 2021. The theme song is "Frontier" performed by Monkey Majik.

Everyone's Daily Life
 is a web-exclusive animated short series released on Toei Tokusatsu Fan Club on July 23, 2020.

Kamen Rider Genms
 is a web-exclusive crossover series of Toei Tokusatsu Fan Club starring Nachi Sakuragi as Gai Amatsu and Tetsuya Iwanaga of Kamen Rider Ex-Aid reprising his role as Kuroto Dan. The theme song is "GAME CHANGER" performed by Hiroyuki Takami, who reprised his role as Masamune Dan in the first entry.
 is the first entry of the web-exclusive series released on April 11, 2021 that comprises two episodes. The events of the series take place after Zero-One Others: Kamen Rider Vulcan & Valkyrie.
 is a sequel to the first entry of the web-exclusive series released on April 17, 2022. This entry features an appearance by Smart Brain from Kamen Rider 555.

Kamen Rider Outsiders
 is a web-exclusive crossover series released on Toei Tokusatsu Fan Club on October 16, 2022 that features cast members from Ex-Aid, Zero-One, 555, Ryuki, Decade, and Saber and serves as a direct sequel to Kamen Rider Genms. The theme song is "What's the Outsiders?" performed by m.c.A.T.

Video game
Kamen Rider: Memory of Heroez is a 3D action game released on October 29, 2020 for PlayStation 4 and Nintendo Switch. While the storyline primarily focuses on the casts of Kamen Rider W and Kamen Rider OOO, the titular Rider of Kamen Rider Zero-One also appears in the game.

Comic 
A comic book of the same name, written by Brian Easton and drawn by Hendry Prasetya and Brian Valenza, was announced by Titan Comics on April 28, 2022. The first issue will release on November 23, 2022. A new foe (known as Kamen Rider Ragnarok) will be introduced in the first issue.

Cast
: 
: 
, : 
: 
: 
: 
: 
: 
: 
: 
: 
, : 
: 
: 
: 
, Ark Driver Voice: 
: 
Progrise and Zetsumerise Key Equipments Voice: Maynard Plant, Blaise Plant
Progrise and Zetsumerise Key Equipments Voice (Kamen Rider Thouser): Mark Weitzman
Narration:

Guest cast

: 
: 
Young Isamu Fuwa (2): .
: 
: 
: 
: 
Himself (10, 11): 
: 
: 
: 
: 
: 
: 
: 
: 
: 
:

Theme songs
Opening theme
"REAL×EYEZ"
Lyrics: Shoko Fujibayashi, Takanori Nishikawa
Composition: J
Arrangement: J×Takanori Nishikawa, DJ'Tekina//Something
Artist: J×Takanori Nishikawa
Episodes 1, 2, 29, and 45 and Specials 1-3 do not feature the show's opening sequence. This song is used as the ending theme in episodes 2 and 45 and as an insert song in episodes 1, 9, 29, 38, and 39 and Specials 1-3.

Insert themes

Lyrics: Megane Hirai
Composition & Arrangement: Go Sakabe
Artist: Tsuyoshi Himura
This song is first used in episode 1.

Lyrics: Megane Hirai
Composition & Arrangement: Go Sakabe
Artist: Tsuyoshi Himura
This song is only used in episode 40.

International releases
 Shout! Factory released the complete series and Kamen Rider Zero-One The Movie: Real×Time on Blu-ray and digital on January 22, 2022, in North America.
 In the Philippines, Kamen Rider Zero-One was aired on GMA Network dubbed in tagalog beginning on February 18, 2023 every Saturdays.

References

External links
Official website at TV Asahi 
Official website at Kamen Rider Web 
Official website  for Zero-One Others 
Official website for Kamen Rider Outsiders and Kamen Rider Genms 

 
2019 Japanese television series debuts
2020 Japanese television series endings
Zero-One
TV Asahi original programming
Androids in television
Television series about artificial intelligence
Cyberpunk television series
Fictional soldiers
Post-traumatic stress disorder in fiction
Terrorism in television
Television productions suspended due to the COVID-19 pandemic